Amitabh Bachchan Sports Complex is an indoor arena located in Allahabad (Prayagraj), Uttar Pradesh.  The 4,000-seat stadium is only indoor stadium in city and was named after famous Indian actor Amitabh Bachchan who was born in the city. It is owned and managed by  UP Sports Directorate. The stadium has facilities for games like basketball.

See also
Chandgi Ram Sports Complex
Madan Mohan Malviya Stadium

External links 

 Wikimapia

References 

Sports venues in Allahabad
Indoor arenas in India
Badminton venues
Basketball venues in India
Amitabh Bachchan
Sports venues completed in 2006
2006 establishments in Uttar Pradesh